The Old Nipawin Bridge is a railway bridge that spans the Saskatchewan River just north of Nipawin, Saskatchewan. It was originally built by the Canadian Pacific Railway. The 'Old Bridge' is a double-deck bridge with the top deck carrying the Torch River Railway (short-line operator) track while a  roadway is on the lower deck.  Since the roadway is narrow, traffic is controlled by signal lights at either end.  On June 16, 2021, Saskatchewan Ministry of Highways closed the road portion of the bridge due to rapidly deteriorating conditions however; the railway portion of the bridge currently remains active.

See also 
 List of bridges in Canada
 List of road-rail bridges

References

Canadian Pacific Railway bridges in Canada
Railway bridges in Saskatchewan
Bridges completed in 1930
Road-rail bridges
Bridges over the Saskatchewan River
Nipawin No. 487, Saskatchewan
Torch River No. 488, Saskatchewan